Michał Przysiężny chose to defend his last year's title, but Benoît Paire defeated him in the semifinals.
Maxime Teixeira won this tournament. He swept the title, defeating Paire in the final (6–3, 6–0).

Seeds

Draw

Finals

Top half

Bottom half

References
 Main Draw
 Qualifying Draw

Open Prevadies Saint-Brieuc - Singles
2011 Singles